Östgötapendeln is a commuter rail system that stretches from the historical provinces Östergötland into Småland in Sweden. Östgötapendeln started its operation June 12, 1995 with the line Norrköping-Linköping-Mjölby-Tranås. In 2010–2015 Östgötapendeln trains continued to Nässjö and Jönköping. They have since been replaced by Krösatågen there. A second line, Norrköping-Linköping-Mjölby-Motala, opened in April 2013, with two new stops at Skänninge and Motala.

The frequency of the service is 4 trains an hour between Norrköping and Mjölby in peak hours, with 2 going to Motala and 2 to Tranås.

Arriva, a subsidiary of Deutsche Bahn is contracted to operate the trains until year 2020 by the passenger transport executives in Östergötland County.

References

Regional rail in Sweden
Transport in Jönköping County
1995 establishments in Sweden
Rail transport in Östergötland County